The 1966 VFL Grand Final was an Australian rules football game contested between the Collingwood Football Club and St Kilda Football Club, held at the Melbourne Cricket Ground in Melbourne on 24 September 1966. It was the 69th annual grand final of the Victorian Football League (VFL), staged to determine the premiers for the 1966 VFL season. The match, attended by 101,655 spectators, was won by St Kilda by a margin of one point, marking that club's first and only premiership victory to date.

Background

In a thrilling finish to the home-and-away season, Collingwood finished minor premiers after easily beating  at Victoria Park, while St Kilda, Geelong, Essendon and Richmond fought for the remaining three qualifying spots. St Kilda managed to hold on to second place in a thrilling contest against  at Moorabbin, while Geelong and Essendon also won their games, which meant that Richmond would miss the finals despite its big win over Fitzroy.

Teams

Umpire – Jeff Crouch

Match summary
Twenty-five minutes into the final quarter and with scores level, Collingwood's Wayne Richardson had a shot at goal on the run but kicked it out of bounds on the full. St Kilda then began to work the ball out of defence after winning the boundary throw-in.  A kick from Ian Cooper saw the ball make its way to centre half-forward. Collingwood defender Ted Potter failed to mark the ball low down, and with the players scrummaging for the ball, a bounce was called. Brian Mynott won the tap for the Saints, but it was intercepted by Potter, who was quickly tackled. Potter, however, managed to get out a handball, but it found its way to St Kilda's Barry Breen, who snapped at goal and kicked a behind to put his side in front. With about a minute left on the clock, Collingwood were able to work the ball towards their forward line. St Kilda's Bob Murray, however, was able to take a mark at centre half-back, and the siren sounded after he kicked the ball towards the wing.

One of the timekeepers was an avid St Kilda fan and blew the final siren for more than ten seconds.

Scorecard

References

External links

See also
 1966 VFL season
 2010 AFL Grand Final

VFL/AFL Grand Finals
Grand
St Kilda Football Club
Collingwood Football Club